Carol Marie Wayne (September 6, 1942 – January 13, 1985) was an American television and film actress. She appeared regularly on The Tonight Show Starring Johnny Carson as the Matinee Lady in the Art Fern's Tea Time Movie sketches.

Early life
Born in Chicago, Wayne began her show business career as a teenage figure skater in the Ice Capades along with her younger sister, Nina. The sisters later became showgirls of the Folies Bergère at the Tropicana Resort & Casino in Las Vegas. Carol followed Nina to Hollywood in the mid-1960s, and the sisters began appearing on television.

Career
Wayne did television guest shots on I Spy (as the title character in the episode "Trouble with Temple"), Bewitched (as a rabbit turned into a cocktail bunny), I Dream of Jeannie (as dim-witted starlet Bootsie Nightingale), Love American Style, Emergency! and The Fall Guy, and appeared in many sketches on The Red Skelton Show.

Wayne said she was "discovered" at a Hollywood party and auditioned for The Tonight Show after appearances as a Las Vegas chorus line dancer.

She gained her greatest fame for appearances (1967–1984) on The Tonight Show, including 100-plus appearances (1971–1984) as the buxom Matinée Lady on The Tonight Show in Johnny Carson's popular Art Fern's Tea Time Movie sketches, which were filled with sexual double entendres. After her death, Carson kept the Art Fern character off the air for most of the next year. He eventually hired Danuta Wesley and later Teresa Ganzel to be his new Matinée Lady.

Wayne made appearances on several game shows during the 1970s including Mantrap and Hollywood Squares. She was a regular panelist on Celebrity Sweepstakes. She landed roles in several films, including Gunn, The Party (both directed by Blake Edwards), Scavenger Hunt, Savannah Smiles and Surf II. Her final onscreen appearance came in the 1984 drama Heartbreakers, for which she received the best reviews of her career. Critic Roger Ebert wrote, "Her performance is so good, so heartbreaking, if you will, that it pulls the whole movie together."
 
In February 1984, Wayne appeared nude in a pictorial for Playboy magazine. The same year, she filed for bankruptcy.

Personal life
Wayne was married three times. She married her first husband, Loreto "Larry" Cera, on May 1, 1965; they divorced in June 1967. In 1969, Wayne married her second husband, rock-music photographer Barry Feinstein, with whom she had a son, Alex Feinstein (b. 1970). The couple divorced in 1974. A year later, she married television and film producer Burt Sugarman, who served as producer on Celebrity Sweepstakes. They divorced in 1980.

Wayne told Johnny Carson in an interview on April 30, 1974, one of 38 appearances, that she enjoyed gardening and growing bonsai trees, and in another interview, breeding Andalusian horses.

Death
In January 1985, Wayne vacationed at the Las Hadas Resort in Manzanillo, Colima, Mexico with companion Edward Durston, a car salesman. After an argument, Wayne reportedly took a walk on the beach. Three days later, a local fisherman found Wayne's body in the shallow bay. An autopsy performed in Mexico revealed no signs of alcohol or other drugs in her body. Her death was ruled "accidental".

Filmography

References

External links

 
 Carol Wayne at the TCM Movie Database

Accidental deaths in Mexico
Actresses from Chicago
American television actresses
American film actresses
Deaths by drowning
1942 births
1985 deaths
20th-century American actresses